The S. S. Minnow is a fictional charter boat on the hit 1960s television sitcom Gilligan's Island.  The ship ran aground on the shore of "an uncharted desert isle" in the south Pacific Ocean, setting the stage for this popular situation comedy. The crew of two were the skipper Jonas Grumby and his first mate Willy Gilligan, and the five passengers were millionaire Thurston Howell III, his wife Lovey Howell, movie star Ginger Grant, professor Roy Hinkley, and farm girl Mary Ann Summers.

The shipwreck was first seen in the season 1 episode "Two on a Raft", which begins with the crew and passengers awaking on the ship. Several times in the course of the series they plan ways to repair the Minnow to get off the island. In the episode "Goodbye Island", Gilligan discovered glue that was believed to be waterproof and permanent. However, it was later revealed that the glue was temporary and before they could push the repaired ship out to sea, the entire vessel literally fell to pieces.

There are many other references to the ship in the rest of the series, such as in the episode "Court-Martial", where an investigation was launched into the Minnow's disappearance, which at first determined that the Skipper was responsible, then later concluding that the Skipper wasn't aware that a storm was coming. It is also revealed in this episode that the reason for the Minnow'''s wreck was that Gilligan threw its anchor overboard without a rope attached to it.

Origin of its name
A minnow is a very small bait fish, but the TV boat was actually named for Newton Minow,Associated Press, "Nostalgic Ride", Express (Washington, D.C.), Sep. 16, 2008, p. 21. who Gilligan's Island executive producer Sherwood Schwartz believed "ruined television". Minow was chairman of the U.S. Federal Communications Commission (FCC) in 1961, and is noted for a speech in which he called American television "a vast wasteland".

The ship prefix S. S. is used for ships that are powered by steam. However, the show's writers did not follow this convention and in some instances depicted it having spark plugs or being diesel-powered.

S. S. Minnow II
The S. S. Minnow II was a successor boat purchased by the Skipper from insurance money for the first in the 1978 made-for-TV movie Rescue from Gilligan's Island. At the end of that movie, the cast and boat are wrecked on the same island, as shown by Gilligan's discovery of a plank with "Minnow I" on it. How they knew to call the first vessel "I" before there was a second is not explained.

This version of the Minnow got destroyed in another ill-fated storm due to Gilligan removing the magnet for the compass during their voyage and the castaways ended up marooned back on the very same island they had escaped months before.

Minnow III
The Minnow III is the plane built by the Professor in the 1979 made-for-TV movie The Castaways on Gilligan's Island, the sequel to Rescue From Gilligan's Island. It does not have the prefix "S. S.", as it is not a steamboat (nor were its boat predecessors).

Minnow IV
The Minnow IV, also introduced in The Castaways on Gilligan's Island, is a small whaling boat run by The Skipper and Gilligan as a shuttle between the island and cruise ships for its passengers who are coming to the island.

Restoration
In 2008, the boat used in the opening of the second and third season color episodes, previously named the Bluejacket, was based at Schooner Cove Marina on the east side of Vancouver Island, in Nanoose Bay, British Columbia. Having put the boat through a major restoration, the new owner planned to use it for charters and sightseeing tours. The owner equipped it with an old life preserver with "S. S. Minnow''" on it, as well as other show items.

References

External links 
 Original Minnow found!
 TV Acres.com

Gilligan's Island
Fictional ships